Christian Rijavec (born 18 April 1972) is an Austrian freestyle skier. He competed at the 1994 Winter Olympics and the 1998 Winter Olympics.

References

1972 births
Living people
Austrian male freestyle skiers
Olympic freestyle skiers of Austria
Freestyle skiers at the 1994 Winter Olympics
Freestyle skiers at the 1998 Winter Olympics
Sportspeople from Klagenfurt